Hassan Louahid nicknamed Achour (14 March 1938 – 17 September 2020) was an Algerian international footballer and manager. He was born in Sétif. He won 16 caps for the Algeria national team and was part of Algeria's squad at the 1968 African Cup of Nations in Ethiopia. He died in Algiers, aged 82.

References

1938 births
2020 deaths
Competitors at the 1967 Mediterranean Games
1968 African Cup of Nations players
Algeria international footballers
Algerian footballers
CR Belouizdad players
CR Belouizdad managers
OMR El Annasser players
Footballers from Sétif
Association football wingers
Algerian football managers
Mediterranean Games competitors for Algeria
21st-century Algerian people
20th-century Algerian people